Champagne-et-Fontaine is a commune in the Dordogne department in Nouvelle-Aquitaine in southwestern France.

Champagne-et-Fontaine is the birthplace of Philip I of France.

Geography
The Lizonne flows southwestward through the northern part of the commune and forms part of its western border.

Population

Villages, hamlets, and localities 

 Ambournet
 au Montey
 au Paris
 au Petit Bois
 au Rouge
 aux Pêcheries
 Basse Foucaudie
 Bois des Chambres
 Carabin
 Champagne
 Château de la Ligerie
 Château du Clauzurou
 Chaumont
 Chez Bidou
 Chez le Tard
 Chez Peillou
 Chez Robin
 Chez Trinquet
 Combe du Prieur
 Cormeille
 Espinasse
 Fombouille
 Fontaine
 Fontaine de Notre-Dame
 Grange du Breuil
 Grange du Mazac
 Grange Neuve
 Grelet
 Gué de Pompeigne
 Haute Foucaudie
 Jaufrenie
 Jovelle
 la Boige
 la Borie
 la Bourelie
 la Croix du Rapt
 la Divinie
 la Faye
 la Feuillade Basse
 la Feuillade Haute
 la Forêt
 la Genevrière
 la Richardie
 la Vaure
 la Vergne
 l'Âge
 Lardinie
 le Cluzeau
 le Combeau
 le Gouyot
 le Grafeuil
 le Grand Clos
 le Luc
 le Mazac
 le Nept
 le Pas de Fontaine
 le Petit Breuil
 le Petit Cluzeau
 le Petit Ferrier
 le Petit Rochat
 le Pigeonnier
 le Quinze
 le Repaire
 le Roc
 le Vivier
 les Bigonnies
 les Chaumes
 les Écures
 les Gacheries
 les Gagneries
 les Gravelles
 les Grilles
 les Jarriges
 les Jartres
 les Mottes
 les Vergnes
 Maine Vignau
 Maison Neuve
 Moulin Chaudeau
 Moulin de Rochat
 Moulin du Vivier
 Pas Vieux
 Plantigarde
 Pompeigne
 Puy de Versac
 Puy Tirel
 Ruisseau de Fontaine
 Saint-Morézi
 Saumont
 Terres du Fougereau
 Veyrines
 Villard

Personalities
For some twenty years the family of Charles de Gaulle owned a country home there called La Ligerie where de Gaulle spent his summers as a youngster. The de Gaulle family sold La Ligerie in 1920.

See also
Communes of the Dordogne department

References

Communes of Dordogne